The yelloweye nannygai or yelloweye redfish (Centroberyx australis) is a member of the family Berycidae. It can reach sizes of up to  TL.

References

External links
 Fishes of Australia : Centroberyx australis

yelloweye nannygai
Marine fish of Southern Australia
yelloweye nannygai